Karl-Göran Mäler (1939 – May 20, 2020) was a Swedish economist.

Mäler was born in 1939 in Sollefteå. He pursued undergraduate study in mathematics, statistics and economics at Stockholm University. Mäler specialized in economics at the graduate level, attending the Massachusetts Institute of Technology and Stanford University in the United States before earning a doctorate from Stockholm University in 1972. He was a professor at the Stockholm School of Economics between 1975 and 2002. Mäler was elected to the Royal Swedish Academy of Sciences in 1981, and served on its Committee for the Sveriges Riksbank Prize in Economic Sciences in Memory of Alfred Nobel until 1994. Mäler and Partha Dasgupta founded the Beijer Institute of Ecological Economics in 1992, and Mäler served as the institute's director through 2006. He and Dasgupta shared the Volvo Environment Prize in 2002. Mäler died in a Stockholm retirement home on 20 May 2020.

References

1939 births
2020 deaths
20th-century Swedish  economists
21st-century Swedish economists
People from Sollefteå Municipality
MIT School of Humanities, Arts, and Social Sciences alumni
Stanford University alumni
Stockholm University alumni
Members of the Royal Swedish Academy of Sciences
Academic staff of the Stockholm School of Economics
Swedish expatriates in the United States
Environmental economists